Alta is an unincorporated community in Helt Township, Vermillion County, in the U.S. state of Indiana.

History
The town was laid out in 1871.  The name probably refers to "elevation".

Geography
Alta is located half a mile west of the Wabash River and about half a mile south of the town of Hillsdale, around the intersection of county roads 775 South and 400 East.  A north-south CSX railroad line runs just east of Alta.

References

Unincorporated communities in Vermillion County, Indiana
Unincorporated communities in Indiana
Terre Haute metropolitan area